Statistics of Emperor's Cup in the 1965 season. The cup was held between January 13 and January 16, 1966.

Overview
It was contested by 8 teams, and Toyo Industries won the championship.

Results

Quarterfinals
Kwansei Gakuin University 1–0 Furukawa Electric
Toyo Industries 5–0 Chuo University
Yawata Steel 5–1 Meiji University
Waseda University 3–0 Hitachi

Semifinals
Kwansei Gakuin University 0–7 Toyo Industries
Yawata Steel 4–3 Waseda University

Final

Toyo Industries 3–2 Yawata Steel
Toyo Industries won the championship.

References
 NHK

Emperor's Cup
Emperor's Cup